Marco Acerbi (Aosta, 29 April 1949-Cervinia, 24 July 1989) was an Italian hurdler.

Biography
Acerbi, one times national champion, has participated in the 1972 Summer Olympics, died prematurely at the age of 40 years.

After his retirement from athletics, he served as an official for the Italian Athletics Federation and founded the Valle d’Aosta Triathlon Association.

Achievements

National titles
1 win in 60 metres hurdles at the Italian Athletics Indoor Championships (1972)

References

External links
 

1949 births
1989 deaths
Athletes (track and field) at the 1972 Summer Olympics
Italian male hurdlers
Olympic athletes of Italy
People from Aosta
Sportspeople from Aosta Valley